There are several rivers named Mutum River.

Brazil
 Mutum River (Amapá)
 Mutum River (Amazonas)
 Mutum River (Espírito Santo)
 Mutum River (Mato Grosso)

See also 
 Mutum (disambiguation)